The Confederation of Turkish Real Trade Unions (HAK-İŞ) is one of the four major national trade union centers in Turkey. It was founded October 22, 1976, and has a membership of 680,000. It was established as a confederation of trade unions close to Islamist National Salvation Party. 

HAK-İŞ is affiliated with the International Trade Union Confederation, and the European Trade Union Confederation.

Affiliates

HAK-İŞ has 21 affiliated unions.

 Real Trade Union for Workers in Food and Tobacco and Beverages Industry (ÖZ GIDA-İŞ) http://www.ozgida-is.org.tr
 Real Trade Union for Workers in Weaving, Knitting and Garment Industry (ÖZ İPLİK-İŞ) http://www.oziplikis.org.tr
 Real Trade Union in Wood Industry (ÖZ AĞAÇ-İŞ) http://www.ozagacis.org.tr
 Trade Union in Steel, Iron, Metal and Auto Industry (ÖZ ÇELİK-İŞ) http://www.celik-is.org
 Real Trade Union in Health Industry (ÖZ SAĞLIK-İŞ) http://www.ozsaglikis.org
 Trade Union for Entire Municipal and General Service Industry (HİZMET-İŞ) http://www.hizmet-is.org.tr
 Trade Union in Agriculture and Forestry Industry (ÖZ ORMAN-İŞ) http://www.ozorman-is.org.tr
 Public Servants Union The Turkish Republic of Northern Cyprus (KAMU-SEN) http://www.kktckamusen.org
 Real Trade Union for Office, Education and Fine Art Workers (ÖZ BÜRO-İŞ) http://www.ozburois.org
 Finance and Bank Workers’ Trade Union (ÖZ FİNANS-İŞ) http://www.ozfinansis.org.tr
 Trade Union of Transportation Sector Workers (ÖZ TAŞIMA-İŞ) http://www.oztasimais.org
 Trade Union for Workers in Private Security and Guarding Sectors (ÖZ GÜVEN-SEN) http://www.ozguvensen.org
 Hotel, Restaurant and Entertainment Places Workers' Trade Union (OLEYİS) http://www.oleyis.org.tr
 Trade Union of Energy Sector Workers (ENERJİ-İŞ) http://www.enerjiis.org.tr
 Trade Union of Port and Shipyard Workers  (LİMAN-İŞ) http://www.limanis.org.tr
 Media Workers' Trade Union (MEDYA-İŞ) http://www.medyais.org
 Trade Union of Cement, Ceramic, Soil and Glass Industry Workers (ÖZ TOPRAK-İŞ) http://www.oztoprakis.org
 Trade Union for Mining Workers (ÖZ MADEN-İŞ) http://www.ozmadenis.org
 Communication Workers’ Trade Union (ÖZ İLETİŞİM-İŞ) http://www.oziletisimis.org.tr
 Trade Union of Petroleum, Chemical and Plastic Industry Workers (ÖZ PETROL-İŞ) http://www.ozpetrolis.org.tr
 Trade Union of Construction Workers (ÖZ İNŞAAT-İŞ) http://www.ozinsaatis.org

See also

 Confederation of Public Workers' Unions
 Confederation of Turkish Trade Unions
 Confederation of Revolutionary Trade Unions of Turkey

External links 
 HAK-İŞ official site.

National trade union centers of Turkey
International Trade Union Confederation
European Trade Union Confederation
Trade unions established in 1976
Organizations based in Ankara